Manasichi Choodu may refer to:

Manasichi Choodu (film)
Manasichi Choodu (TV series)